Diaspora is a spice company that trades in spices sourced to small farmers in South East Asia. The company was founded in 2017 by Indian-American Sana Javeri Kadri, and is based in California's Bay Area.

Kadri was born in Mumbai but lived in the United States. She left for India in 2016 after she became disappointed in the quality of the turmeric for sale in the US. Her investigation into the spice trade led her to found a company that trades in spice from small family farms; the first spice marketed by Diaspora was turmeric. Since then, Diaspora (whose mission is "to disrupt the industry with culture, equity, and joy") has expanded to sell over 40 different spices and spice mixes, from over 200 family farms. In July 2022, the company acquired $2.1 million in funding.

References

External links

2017 establishments in California